The TRW Low Maintenance Rifle or LMR was a proposed insurgency weapon designed by TRW Inc. (formerly Thompson Ramo Wooldridge) of the United States during the Vietnam War. The intent was to produce an easy-to-use and operate firearm which could be disseminated to insurgent forces supporting the United States' military interests. The design utilized the same 5.56×45mm NATO ammunition and STANAG magazines as the M16 rifle. It would have been equipped with the M6 bayonet along with its M8A1 scabbard.

Development began in 1971, and ceased in 1973 with the weapon never having been fielded.

See also
FP-45 Liberator/Deer gun - insurgency handguns of similar concept.
International Ordnance MP2 - another insurgency firearm derived from the Sten.
Avenger submachine gun - improvised submachine gun made and used by Ulster Loyalists in Northern Ireland during The Troubles.
FG 42/Sturmgewehr 52 - rifles of similar external design.
Sterling 7.62 - an "emergency standby weapon" of British origin.
MG 30 - a light machine gun of similar external design.
Knight's Armament Company SR-47 - an assault rifle that was intended to have similarly high reliability as the LMR.

References
Notes

Sources

External links
TECHNICAL MANUAL - OPERATION AND MAINTENANCE
Forgotten Weapons - TRW Low Maintenance Rifle
Modern Firearms - TRW LMR
The TRW Low-Maintenance Rifle: A cheap response to the AK-47

Trial and research firearms of the United States
Insurgency weapons
TRW Inc.